Faisal Bezzine (born in Tunis on January 12, 1975) is a Tunisian actor.

Biography
He obtained his first role in the series El Khottab Al Bab where he played Stayech, the adopted child of the Tammars, alongside Mouna Noureddine and Raouf Ben Amor. Then, he finds Noureddine in the TV series Mnamet Aroussia. In 2003, he starred in the soap opera Chez Azaïez before playing the role of Fouchika in the series Choufli Hal and his TV movie, which made him known to the general public. 
He is married.

Television
 1996–97: El Khottab Al Bab : Stayech (Kmayer)
 2001: Mnamet Aroussia (The Dream of Arussia) : Azzaiz Chared
 2003: 3and Azaïez (In Azaiz Boutique) : Moez
 2004: Loutil (The Hostel) : Assil
 2005 : Café Jalloul of Lotfi Ben Sassi & Imed Ben Hamida : Azza
 2006–09 : Choufli Hal (Find Me A Solution) (TV Serial) : Fouchika – Fareed
 2014: Ikawi Saadek (May God make you have more chance) : Zarbut
 2017: Bolice 4.0 (Police Normal Status) : Abu Yaareb Mutiaa El Arfaui
 2019: Zanket El Bacha by Nejib Mnasria : Ftila (Wannas)
 2022 : Kan Ya Ma Kanich (Season 2) by Abdelhamid Bouchnak

Telefilm
 2009: Choufli Hal (téléfilm) : Fouchika

Theater
 1994: Halwani Bab Souika by Bachir Drissi and Hamadi Arafa
 Carthage and After
 Marichal Ammar
 Le Clown & The Dress of The Princess
 The Trip Of Ghanney
 Continue
 The Revolution of the Nature

References
  interview of Faisal Bezzine, 9 June 2010, mosaiquefm.net

1964 births
Tunisian male film actors
Living people
Tunisian male television actors
21st-century Tunisian male actors
People from Tunis